Thunder of Battle is a 1964 Italian historical drama film set in Rome in 493 BC.  The plot is an adaptation of the Roman legend about the general who won great victories for the Romans over their enemies the Volscians, but was then forced into exile by his political enemies at home.

Cast
 Gordon Scott as "Coriolanus"
 Alberto Lupo as "Escinius"
 Lilla Brignone as "Volumnia"
 Philippe Hersent as "Cominius"
 Rosalba Neri as "Virginia"
 Aldo Bufi Landi as "Marco"
 Nerio Bernardi as "Menenius Agripa"
 Piero Pastore
 Tullio Altamura
 Nello Pazzafini

Release
Thunder of Battle was released in Italy with a 96 minute running time on March 5, 1964. The film re-uses footage from The Trojan Horse.

See also
 List of historical drama films
 List of films set in ancient Rome

Footnotes

References

External links
 
 Thunder of Battle at Variety Distribution

1964 films
French historical adventure films
Films set in ancient Rome
Films set in the 5th century BC
Films based on classical mythology
Peplum films
Films about gladiatorial combat
Films directed by Giorgio Ferroni
Films scored by Carlo Rustichelli
1960s historical films
Sword and sandal films
1960s Italian films